Hot-air dryer may refer to:

Hand dryer
Blowdryer